Chaleshom (also Romanized as Chāleshom; also known as Chalisham and Chalistan) is a village in Khara Rud Rural District, in the Central District of Siahkal County, Gilan Province, Iran. At the 2006 census, its population was 437, in 117 families.

References 

Populated places in Siahkal County